The Betrayal of America is a book by Vincent Bugliosi (Thunder's Mouth Press, 2001) which is largely based on an article he wrote for The Nation entitled "None Dare Call It Treason", which argues that the US Supreme Court's December 12, 2000, 5–4 decision in Bush v. Gore unlawfully handed the 2000 U.S. presidential election to George W. Bush. Bugliosi declares that the decision damaged both the US Constitution and democracy in general. He accuses the five majority judges of moral culpability by endangering Americans' constitutional freedoms.

See also
 Unprecedented: The 2000 Presidential Election – documentary featuring Bugliosi

External links
 Salon.com review of The Betrayal of America

2001 non-fiction books
Books about the 2000 United States presidential election
Books by Vincent Bugliosi